So Nice is an album by saxophonist Houston Person which was recorded in 2011 and released on the HighNote label.

Reception

In his review on Allmusic, Ken Dryden states "Houston Person is a very versatile veteran tenor saxophonist who tends to get overlooked in critics' polls, yet his extensive musical resumé is ample proof that he is a jazz master. This 2011 session ranges from a duet to septet, with everyone playing compact solos, keeping all but one under the six-minute mark, a lost art in modern jazz. ... Highly recommended". On All About Jazz, Greg Simmons noted " Houston Person isn't breaking any new ground with So Nice. He doesn't have to. He does what he does, and he does it really well".

Track listing 
 "Blues Everywhere" (Shirley Scott) – 5:18
 "All Too Soon" (Duke Ellington, Carl Sigman) – 5:39
 "I Wished on the Moon" (Ralph Rainger, Dorothy Parker) – 3:33	
 "Kiss and Run" (Rene Denoncin, William Engvick, Jack Ledru) – 5:33
 "So Nice" (Elmo Hope) – 4:07
 "I've Grown Accustomed to Her Face" (Frederick Loewe, Alan Jay Lerner) – 5:00	
 "Close to You" (Burt Bacharach, Hal David) – 4:40	
 "Star Eyes" (Gene de Paul, Don Raye) – 5:08
 "Minor Inconvenience" (Houston Person) – 4:41
 "Easy Living" (Rainger, Leo Robin) – 4:25
 "Everything I Love" (Cole Porter) – 4:58
 "Stephen Sondheim Medley: Small World/Anyone Can Whistle" (Jule Styne, Stephen Sondheim/Sondheim) – 6:25

Personnel 
Houston Person – tenor saxophone
Warren Vache – cornet, flugelhorn (tracks 1-3 & 8)
Mark Patterson – trombone (tracks 1, 5, 6, 8 & 9)
John Di Martino – piano 
Howard Alden – guitar (tracks 1, 2 & 9-11)
Ray Drummond – bass 
Lewis Nash – drums

References 

Houston Person albums
2011 albums
HighNote Records albums
Albums recorded at Van Gelder Studio